In mathematics:

 In abstract algebra and mathematical logic a derivative algebra is an algebraic structure that provides an abstraction of the derivative operator in topology and which provides algebraic semantics for the modal logic wK3.
 In abstract algebra, the derivative algebra of a not-necessarily associative algebra A over a field F is the subalgebra of the algebra of linear endomorphisms of A consisting of the derivations.
 In differential geometry a derivative algebra is a vector space with a product operation that has similar behaviour to the standard cross product of 3-vectors.